Davenport Murchison Ranges is an interim Australian bioregion located in the Northern Territory. The bioregion is part of the larger Great Sandy-Tanami desert ecoregion.

Subregions
Davenport Murchison Ranges is made up of three subregions:
 Ashburton Range (DMR01) – 
 Davenport (DMR02) – 
 Barkly (DMR03) –

Protected areas
Less than 5% of the bioregion is in protected areas, the largest of which is Iytwelepenty / Davenport Range National Park in the Barkly subregion.

References

Biogeography of the Northern Territory
IBRA regions
Deserts and xeric shrublands